Kotyk is a gender-neutral Ukrainian surname that may refer to:
Ken Kotyk (born 1981), Canadian bobsledder
Seamus Kotyk (born 1980), Canadian ice hockey coach
Valentin Kotyk (1930–1944), Soviet Pioneer and partisan scout
Valentyna Kotyk (born 1978), Ukrainian football player

See also
 

Ukrainian-language surnames